Katora village is located in Zira tehsil in Firozpur district in Punjab.This village is 48 Km away from the district headquarter Firozpur. Katora village is also a Gram Panchayat.

Literacy rate of this village is 59.33%.

Total population of this village is 1,040. Male population is 544 while female population is 496.

Pin code of this village is 142028.

References 

Villages in Firozpur district